Michael Rohde (March 3, 1894 - February 5, 1979) was a Danish amateur football (soccer) player, who played 40 matches and scored 22 goals for the Danish national team from 1915 to 1931, and competed at the 1920 Summer Olympics. In June 1931 he beat Poul "Tist" Nielsen's record from 1925, as Rohde became the first Dane to play 39 international games. By his international retirement in September 1931, he had played 40 international games, a record broken by Fritz Tarp in September 1932. Rohde played for Danish amateur club B.93 throughout his entire senior career, winning three Danish championships. From 1911 to 1933, Rohde scored 254 goals in 252 matches for B 93, and he most famously scored all four goals, when B.93 beat English professional team Huddersfield FC 4-3.

Honours
Danish championship : 1916, 1929, 1930

References

External links
Danish national team profile

1894 births
1979 deaths
Danish men's footballers
Denmark international footballers
Boldklubben af 1893 players
Olympic footballers of Denmark
Footballers at the 1920 Summer Olympics
Danish football managers
Boldklubben af 1893 managers
Association football forwards